Naim Araidi (April 2, 1950 – October 2, 2015) was an Israeli Druze academic and writer known for his poems in both Hebrew and Arabic.

Education
Araidi was born in Maghar, Israel and completed his elementary school in his village, then moved to Haifa to complete his secondary education. He went on to gain B.A in Hebrew language and Political Science and another B.A in Hebrew Literature and Comparative Literature. Then he gained a M.A in Hebrew Literature and Comparative Literature at the University of Haifa. This was followed with a Ph.D in Hebrew Literature from Bar-Ilan University. His doctoral thesis was on the poetry of Uri Zvi Greenberg.

Work and writing career
He served as an instructor and a lecturer in both the University of Haifa and Bar-Ilan University. Then he moved to Gordon College and the Arab College for Education in Israel. He then served as the Director of the Children's Literature center at the Arab College as well as the coordinator of Studies for the Non-Jewish students at Gordon College. Dr. Naim presented two weekly programmes on Channel 2, a children's programme and a news programme. He also established "Al-Sewar" magazine. He held many public positions and participated in a large number of international festivals for writing and poetry. Many of Araidi's published works appear in translation.
For the first time in Italy in 2014 an anthology of his poems was published by Seam Edizioni. The first edition was presented during the roman poetical twinning with Ottobre in Poesia in 2013. The second edition occasioned a tour organized by the same publisher and poets Uke Bucpapaj Beppe Costa, Stefania Battistella who translated the work.

Nissan Festival
Araidi established the Nissan organization for Literature in 1999. The international Nissan Festival is held annually in April in Maghar.

Ambassadorship
In April 2012, Araidi was supposed to serve as Israeli ambassador to New Zealand.  In June, that decision was changed and he was instead appointed as ambassador to Norway where he served until 2014, when he resigned after allegations of  “inappropriate behaviour.”

Published works

In Hebrew
Is Love Possible
In Five Dimensions
Soldier of Water
Perhaps it Love
Back to the Village
Compassion and Fear

In Arabic
Devils and Graves
As Illusions of Land
As Illusion of the Sun
Alone
Hope is Forever
Songs of the Carmel in Maritime Love

In Italian
Canzoni di Galilea , Seam Ed. (2013, 2° ed. 2014)

Prizes and awards

Prime Minister's Award for Hebrew Literature, 1986
Creative award for Arabic Literature
Senate of Paris Award, 1990
Honorary doctorate, The International Center for Poetry, USA, 1991
Prize awarded by "Omanut La'am for the Promotion of Culture in Israel", 1993

References

External links
official websitesite
Egypt to publish Israeli novels for first time Asia One News (June 12, 2009) Access date: 25 March 2001

Israeli poets
1950 births
2015 deaths
Israeli Druze
University of Haifa alumni
Academic staff of Bar-Ilan University
Academic staff of the University of Haifa
Ambassadors of Israel to Norway
People from Maghar
Bar-Ilan University alumni